Rafael Rocha Ramírez (born 29 January 1956) is a Mexican former swimmer who competed in the 1972 Summer Olympics.

References

1956 births
Living people
Mexican male swimmers
Male backstroke swimmers
Olympic swimmers of Mexico
Swimmers at the 1972 Summer Olympics
Pan American Games competitors for Mexico
Swimmers at the 1971 Pan American Games
Central American and Caribbean Games gold medalists for Mexico
Competitors at the 1974 Central American and Caribbean Games
Central American and Caribbean Games medalists in swimming
20th-century Mexican people